Ernie Anderson (20 November 1918 – 27 January 2001) was a Scotland international rugby union player.

Rugby Union career
He played for Stewart's College FP.

He represented Edinburgh District.

References

Sources

 Bath, Richard (ed.) The Scotland Rugby Miscellany (Vision Sports Publishing Ltd, 2007 )
 Massie, Allan A Portrait of Scottish Rugby (Polygon, Edinburgh)

1918 births
2001 deaths
Scottish rugby union players
Scotland international rugby union players
Rugby union players from Edinburgh
Stewart's College FP players
Edinburgh District (rugby union) players
Rugby union scrum-halves